Hoodsgrove is a townland in the parish of Rosbercon, County Kilkenny, Ireland. It is bordered by Ballybeg to the east, Tinneranny to the north and Kilbrahan to the south. The Mile Bush is a notable landmark, standing in a fork on the main New Ross to Millinavat road.

See also
List of townlands in County Kilkenny

Townlands of County Kilkenny